Elvis Inspirational, RCA's 2006 compilation, is part of a set of six theme-based compilations that also includes Elvis Rock, Elvis Country, Elvis Movies, Elvis Live and Elvis R&B and is made up of pop and gospel recordings seen to be inspirational, including Paul Simon's "Bridge Over Troubled Water," Neil Diamond's "And the Grass Won't Pay No Mind," Mac Davis' "In the Ghetto," "Danny Boy," and "The Impossible Dream".

Track listing

Credits
AllMusic lists:
 A&R – John Hudson
 Art Direction – Erwin Gorostiza
 Audio Production, Compilation Producers – Roger Semon, Ernst Mikael Jørgensen
 Composers – C. Gabriel Battersby, W. Earl Brown, Johnny Christopher, Joe Darion, Mac Davis, Neil Diamond, Dallas Frazier, Charles H. Gabriel, Larry Gatlin, Artie Glenn, Oscar Hammerstein II, Stuart K. Hine, Mitch Leigh, Gene MacLellan, Paul Rader, Dottie Rambo, Jerry Reed, Richard Rodgers, Paul Simon
 Design – Jeffrey Schulz
 Executive Producer – Joseph DiMuro
 Liner Notes – Michael Hill
 Mastering – Vic Anesini
 Production Assistant – Rob Santos
 Project Coordinator – Jennifer Liebeskind
 Project Directors – Iris Maenza, Matthew Stringer

References

Elvis Presley compilation albums
RCA Records compilation albums
2006 compilation albums
Pop rock compilation albums
Compilation albums published posthumously